Silly Scandals is a 1931 Fleischer Studios Talkartoon animated short film starring Bimbo and featuring Betty Boop. This short is the fifth animated short to feature Betty Boop and the first time she is known as Betty after previously being nameless.

Synopsis
Bimbo sneaks into the theater stage show. In a vaudeville act the crowd cheer Betty by name when she comes on stage. Betty Boop, with dog's ears, a white nose, many curls and an enormous head, performs a song called "You're Driving Me Crazy". During Betty's performance her dress falls off, revealing a frilly bra. Bimbo runs afoul of a stage hypnotist.

References

External links
 
 Silly Scandals at Heptune
 

1931 films
Betty Boop cartoons
1930s American animated films
American black-and-white films
1931 animated films
Paramount Pictures short films
Fleischer Studios short films
Short films directed by Dave Fleischer